Denis Clive Hulme  (18 June 1936 – 4 October 1992), commonly known as Denny Hulme, was a New Zealand racing driver who won the  Formula One World Drivers' Championship for the Brabham team. Between his debut at Monaco in 1965 and his final race in the 1974 US Grand Prix, he started 112 Grand Prix, resulting eight victories and 33 trips to the podium. He also finished third in the overall standing in 1968 and 1972.

Hulme showed versatility by dominating the Canadian-American Challenge Cup (Can-Am) for Group 7 sports cars. As a member of the McLaren team that won five straight titles between 1967 and 1971, he won the individual Drivers' Championship twice and runner-up on four other occasions.

Following his Formula One tenure with Brabham, Hulme raced for McLaren in multiple formats—Formula One, Can-Am, and at the Indianapolis 500. Hulme retired from Formula One at the end of the 1974 season but continued to race Australian Touring Cars.

Hulme was nicknamed 'The Bear', because of his "gruff nature" and "rugged features"; however, he was also "sensitive (...) unable to express his feelings, except in a racing car". During the early part of his career, Hulme preferred to race bare foot as he believed that it gave him a better feel of the throttle. This changed in 1960 when he started competing in the more highly regulated European championships.

During his career, Hulme drove the most powerful cars of his era. He raced in F1, F2, Indycars, saloon/touring cars, CanAm and endurance races, all during the same season. After retiring from F1, he even drove in truck races.

Hulme's death by heart attack, whilst driving a BMW M3 during the Bathurst 1000 in Australia, made him the seventh former Formula One champion to die, and the first to die of natural causes (versus three racing incidents, two incidents on public roads and one incident involving aircraft).

Early racing career 
Hulme was born on a tobacco farm belonging to his parents in Motueka in the South Island of New Zealand. His father Clive Hulme was awarded a Victoria Cross, as a sniper, while fighting in the Battle of Crete in 1941.

Whilst growing up on his family's farm in Pongakawa (near Te Puke), Hulme learned to drive a truck while sitting on his father's lap, and by the age of six, he was driving solo. He left school and went to work in a garage. He saved up enough money to buy an MG TF, promptly entering this in hillclimbing events. After that his father brought a MGA for him. After making impressive progress he purchased a F2 Cooper-Climax, subsequently being chosen for the New Zealand Driver to Europe program, along with fellow Kiwi, George Lawton. The pair of young New Zealanders began competing in Formula Junior and Formula Two across Europe, in a Cooper-BMC and Cooper–Ford respectively. Hulme won the 1960 Gran Premio di Pescara for Formula Juniors, but the newspapers back in New Zealand made no mention of this, as they wrote only about Bruce McLaren. However, the year, 1960 ended in disaster, when Lawton crashed during a race at Roskilde (Denmark) dying in Hulme's arms.

As the New Zealand press were ignoring Hulme, he hired a 2½ litre Cooper from Reg Parnell and entered it in the 1961 New Zealand Gold Star Championship. He won the title straight away. He appeared at Le Mans for the Abarth team, taking a class win in S850 the class (partnered by fellow Kiwi Angus Hyslop), before Ken Tyrrell invited the likable (but sometimes gruff) New Zealander to race in his Formula Junior and Formula Two team, in 1962, when Tony Maggs was unavailable due to his Formula One commitments.

Once there, basing himself in London, he worked as a mechanic in Jack Brabham's garage in Chessington and began to pave his way on his motor-racing path. It was Brabham who gave him drives in his Brabham sportscars and single seaters.  During the 1963 season, he won seven International Formula Junior and after some impressive performances there, it was his old boss Jack Brabham who gave Hulme the call and he joined the Australian legend's F2 team. In 1964, the pair set about dominating the Championship that year, resulting in a one–two finish in the FFSA Trophées de France series. The pair also finished one–two in the 1966 series. During this spell in F2 between 1964 and 1966, Hulme won a total of three races in the series, plus two non-championship events (the 1964 Grote Prijs van Limborg and the 1965 Spring Trophy).  Hulme was rewarded with some non-championship Formula One races.

Away from single seaters, Hulme also raced the occasional saloon car. In appalling conditions, on 6 July 1963, Hulme won his first major saloon car race. The second Motor-sponsored Six-Hour, a round of the European Touring Car Championship, saw the pre-race favourite, a 7-litre Ford Galaxie driven by Dan Gurney and Jack Brabham flounder in the wet and the Jaguars dominated the race. Hulme would win, partnered by Roy Salvadori, after the winners on the road were disqualified for engine irregularities.

Formula One career

1965–1967 – with Brabham

After making numerous appearances in non-championship events for Brabham during the 1964 season, as the Brabham team had signed Dan Gurney to race alongside their boss, Hulme finally got the call he had been waiting for, making his World Championship debut in 1965 at Monaco. Later that year, he scored his first points, for fourth position at the daunting Clermont-Ferrand (Charade) circuit in France.

1966 was Hulme's first full season of Formula One. Now, after the departure of Dan Gurney, he was the outright number two at the Brabham team behind Jack himself. Finishing a fine fourth that year (with Jack winning the Drivers' and the Brabham team the Constructors' Championship), the highlights came with a third place at Reims in France, a second behind Brabham at Brands Hatch, and the fastest lap at Zandvoort, before ignition problems put paid to his race there. Whilst his boss won the World title, Hulme made it to the podium four times during season, finishing fourth overall in the standings.

The 1967 Championship was essentially an internal affair within the Brabham Racing Organisation team for most of the year, but the new Lotus 49 gave Jim Clark and Graham Hill the opportunity to bite back. Their Brabham-Repcos were not the fastest cars, however they were reliable and consistent, as were Brabham and Hulme. During the season, he would take two wins in the 11-race Championship, at Monte Carlo and the ferocious Nürburgring (the Green Hell).

Although Hulme silenced many critics with his excellent win in Monaco, the race was marred by the appalling accident that would claim the life of Lorenzo Bandini, who was chasing Hulme at the time of the crash. His second Grand Prix win of 1967, was on the legendary Nordschleife of the Nürburgring. This victory proved his versatility on any type of track. A further six visits to the podium gave Hulme the advantage he needed. He won the Championship by five points from Brabham, and a further five from Jim Clark. Hulme was the first (and to date, only) Formula One World Champion from New Zealand.

1968–1974 – with McLaren

 saw a move to the McLaren team, owned by fellow Kiwi Bruce McLaren.  Although the 'Bruce and Denny Show' dominated the North American Can-Am sportcar series from 1966, their time in Formula One was less successful. The South African race, held at the legendary Kyalami circuit, proved difficult for the team. Despite having to use the old BRM V12 engines on an old M5A chassis, Hulme brought it home a creditable fifth.

By the Spanish round at Jarama, the Cosworth DFV V8 engine was installed in the brand new M7A chassis and the performances improved. After victory in the BRDC International Trophy, Hulme picked up second place in Spain, before taking two more wins that year at Monza and in Canada, leaving him with an outside chance of retaining the Championship crown against Graham Hill and the young Jackie Stewart.

The finale, in Mexico City, determined the champion that year, but Hulme suffered a suspension failure on his McLaren.

 was a disaster for Hulme: the revised M7A chassis struggled with reliability and Hulme managed only 20 points, attaining one victory, at the final round at the Mexican Grand Prix. Hulme ended the season in sixth position in the drivers' standings.

 brought a new decade, but Hulme's luck did not change. Team boss and friend Bruce McLaren was killed whilst testing the CanAm McLaren M8D, which affected Hulme. Another problem occurred that year when he suffered burns to his hands from a methanol fire during practice for the Indianapolis 500. As a result, he missed the Dutch Grand Prix in 1970. Undeterred, he felt he owed it to Bruce and the McLaren team to continue racing. Besides his emotional distress and serious burns, he still managed a creditable fourth in the championship with 27 points.

Although Hulme would claim third place in the 1970 Mexican Grand Prix, the race was marred by the immense crowd of over 200,000. The crowd proved almost uncontrollable and almost forced the cancellation of the race. They were crammed in front of the guard-rails, sat at the trackside and ran across the track itself. The drivers were concerned that someone would be killed. During qualifying, Hulme missed some children by inches. They were playing a game of chicken to see who got nearest to the cars as they hurtled past.

 started promisingly. At Kyalami, he led dominantly—but the rising-rate suspension system forced him out, after only a few laps. The McLaren team were in disarray. The season was even worse than 1970 results-wise, as Hulme did not even make the podium, although he set the fastest laps in Canada and the United States that year—but results were hard to come by. Hulme ended up ninth in the standings for 1971.

Partnered with good friend Peter Revson, Hulme was back on winning ways taking victory in South Africa, and a few fine podiums elsewhere, finishing 1972 in third place with 39 points. Meanwhile, Hulme also won the non-championship International Gold Cup race at Oulton Park.

Amazingly, Hulme scored only one pole position in his F1 career aboard a McLaren M23, in 1973 at Kyalami—he appeared to have a good relationship with the South African venue.

By the 1973 Belgian Grand Prix, Hulme and McLaren had taken F1 safety forward, when his car introduced the Graviner life-support system to Formula One, supplying the driver breathable air in the event of fire.

Hulme won the Swedish Grand Prix luckily, though he also set the fastest lap. The race seemed to be set up for a home victory for Ronnie Peterson, with his Lotus teammate, Emerson Fittipaldi in second, when the Lotuses hit trouble. Fittipaldi being slowed with gearbox issues, and then Peterson with a slow rear wheel puncture. As Hulme decided to run with harder tyres, he passed Peterson on the penultimate lap to win. Hulme expressed sadness to "have taken that away from Ronnie".

He and Revson had built up a strong friendship off the back of their F1 camaraderie—they also competed together in the Can-Am series. When Revson left McLaren at the end of 1973 to join Shadow, Hulme would have been disappointed.

In his time at McLaren, Hulme won six Grands Prix, but he was nearing the end of his time in F1, and his competitive urges were being blunted by a growing apprehension about the dangers of racing. After the Brazilian Grand Prix in which Hulme finished in twelfth place, these fears were well founded. when testing at Kyalami commenced, in March 1974, Peter Revson suffered a front suspension failure (broken front Ball Joint), veering head-on into the barriers. Hulme tried in vain to save his friend's life, but to no avail. After the accident Hulme announced that he would see out  before retiring from Grand Prix racing. However, other than winning the Argentine event (he inherited the lead when his now teammate Fittipaldi inadvertently knocked-off the electrical "kill-switch" on his steering wheel, on the penultimate lap) and coming home second in Austria, he did not make much of an impact on the season, and he retired dignified at the end of the year and stepped away from the sport and returned to New Zealand.

Away from F1

1966 Le Mans 24 hours 
At the finish of the 1966 Le Mans 24 hours, the two Shelby-American Inc. entered Ford GT40 MK II's were both on the lead lap, running first and second, with the car Hulme was partnering with Ken Miles in the lead. In the lead half-hour of the race, the Fords bunched up together in a pre-arranged plan for Bruce McLaren and Miles to cross the line, headlights ablaze, in a dead-heat. Unfortunately the dead-heat that Henry Ford II had so proudly planned did not come off, as the timekeepers decided that a dead-heat was technically impossible as the Hulme/Miles car had qualified faster than the McLaren/Amon car, and therefore covered a shorter race distance. Therefore, when the two cars arrived side by side at the finish, Bruce McLaren and Chris Amon were classified as the winners, with Hulme and Ken Miles in second.

Can-Am (1966–1972) 
In 1966, while driving for the Brabham team in Formula One, Hulme drove in the inaugural season of the Can-Am racing series of FIA Group 7 racing, driving the same Sid Taylor entered Lola T70 he had driven with success in UK Group 7 races that year, but achieving no success in the Can-Am races. In 1967 he joined the McLaren team of New Zealand countryman Bruce McLaren for the series, replacing Chris Amon who had gone to Ferrari.  This partnership became so successful, the Americans called them the 'Bruce and Denny Show', such was their domination.

In the 1967 season, the year of his F1 Championship win with Brabham, Hulme finished second to team leader Bruce McLaren for the Can-Am championship, scoring three wins in six races and earning 24 points in the McLaren M6A. Hulme won the Can-Am Championship in 1968, taking three victories in the six race season, earning 35 points in the McLaren M8A. 1969 saw the McLaren team continue to dominate the series; driving the McLaren M8B, they won every race, with multiple 1–2 finishes, and even a 1–2–3 finish when Dan Gurney drove the spare car. Hulme scored five victories in eleven races in 1969, earning 160 points to finish second to teammate McLaren in the championship.

The 1970 season was a difficult one for the team, as they mourned the loss of leader Bruce McLaren, who had died while pre-season testing the McLaren M8D "Batmobile" at the Goodwood Circuit. Teamed first with driver Dan Gurney, then with driver Peter Gethin, Hulme led the team with six wins in ten races, winning his second Can-Am Championship driving the M8D to 132 points—more than double the number of the second-place competitor. For the 1971 season Hulme's teammate was his good friend Peter Revson, who took the Can-Am crown that year with Hulme in second (three wins in ten races), driving the McLaren M8F. In his final season, Hulme drove the McLaren M20 to second place in the 1972 championship on 65 points, with two wins in the nine race season.

Following his quiet start in the 1966 season, Hulme scored 22 wins with 11 second place and 2 third-place finishes in 52 Can-Am races from 1967 through 1972 – standing on the podium for 67% of the races during those six seasons.  In those same six seasons, he was the Can-Am season champion twice, and championship runner-up four times.  His 22 career wins are the most by any driver in the Can-Am series.

Indy 500 
Hulme competed in the Indianapolis 500 on four occasions: 1967, 1968, 1969, and 1971. His best results in the event were in 1967 and 1968, both times finishing fourth. He did not compete in the 1970 race, due to methanol burns to the hands after a fire during practice. Hulme was named the 1967 Indianapolis 500 Rookie of the Year.

Tasman Series 
Hulme finished third in the 1964 Tasman Series with one win and three podiums. He would later compete in 1967 and 1968, collecting a podium in each year.

British Sportscar Championship (1965–1969)
On weekends away from the Formula One, Hulme would sometimes race for Sid Taylor Racing in the British Sportscar Championship. During this time, he won a total of 12 races, mostly in a Lola T70, including three RAC Tourist Trophies, one of which was a round of the 1965 World Sportscar Championship.

After F1 
After leaving the sport, Hulme led the GPDA (Grand Prix Drivers' Association) for a brief period, but the cut and thrust nature of the post was ill-suited to his gentlemanly nature and he did not fill the post for very long. He then retired to New Zealand, returning to touring cars to race occasionally in the Benson & Hedges 500 race at Pukekohe Park Raceway in the late 1970s first in Chrysler Chargers then later a Volkswagen Golf, partnering Stirling Moss on occasion for the 500 kilometre endurance format.

Hulme began racing regularly again in 1982 with amateur racer Ray Smith, building up a team with the Holden Commodore V8 capable of winning the New Zealand Production Car Series for Group A touring cars in 1983–84. Hulme also started racing in Australia, racing in the team of former European compatriot Frank Gardner's JPS Team BMW, which included second in class at the 1984 Bathurst 1000.

Hulme returned to Europe in 1986 racing in the European Touring Car Championship in a Tom Walkinshaw Racing prepared Rover Vitesse. That campaign culminated in a victory in the RAC Tourist Trophy, Hulme's fourth win in the event, 18 years after his third win. After that Hulme raced briefly for Bob Jane's Mercedes-Benz team before linking up with Larry Perkins in 1987, moving with Perkins in 1988 to the newly formed Holden Racing Team. It was with Holden, that Hulme would record his last visit to a podium, when he finished second, in the 1988 South Australia Cup. Hulme would later join Benson & Hedges Racing, another team run by Frank Gardner in 1990. In the meantime, Hulme was a keen enthusiast of truck racing, which became popular in New Zealand in the early 1990s running Scania trucks, returning to Europe to race in European Truck Championship.

Death 
A favourite event of Hulme's was the Bathurst 1000, held at the famous Mount Panorama track in Australia. In the 1992 event he was driving a semi-works supported BMW M3 for Benson & Hedges Racing when after complaining over the car-to-pits radio of blurred vision (originally thought to be because of the heavy rain) Hulme suffered a massive heart attack at the wheel whilst driving along the high-speed Conrod Straight. When marshals reached the scene, they found Hulme still strapped in. He was taken from the car straight to Bathurst Hospital where he was officially pronounced dead.

According to his sister Anita, Hulme's health began deteriorating after the death of his 21-year-old son, Martin Clive, on Christmas Day, 1988, at Lake Rotoiti in the Bay of Plenty. "He was so upset after Martin’s death", says Anita. "He used to go and sit in the cemetery. I know that he died of a broken heart".

Legacy
Several awards were named in Hulme's memory:

 The Denny Hulme Memorial Trophy awarded at the Targa Tasmania
 The NZ Motor Cup: Denny Hulme Memorial Trophy awarded during the Toyota Racing Series

Hulme was portrayed by Ben Collins in the 2019 film Ford v Ferrari.

Honours and awards
 1967 – New Zealand Sportsman of the Year.
 1967/1970/1974 – Winner of the Hawthorn Memorial Trophy.
 1992 – Appointed an Officer of the Order of the British Empire, for services to motorsport, in the 1992 Queen's Birthday Honours
 1993 – Inducted into the New Zealand Sports Hall of Fame.
 1994 – Inducted into the New Zealand Motorsports Wall of Fame.
 1998 – Inducted into the Motorsports Hall of Fame of America.
 2002 – Inducted into the International Motorsports Hall of Fame.

Racing record

Career summary

Complete Formula One World Championship results 
(key) (Races in bold indicate pole position)

Non-championship Formula One results 
(key) (Races in bold indicate pole position) (Races in italics indicate fastest lap)

Complete British Saloon Car Championship results
(key) (Races in bold indicate pole position; races in italics indicate fastest lap.)

Tasman Series

Complete Canadian-American Challenge Cup results
(key) (Races in bold indicate pole position) (Races in italics indicate fastest lap)

* Joint fastest lap.

Indianapolis 500

Complete 24 Hours of Le Mans results

24 Hours of Daytona

Complete Bathurst 1000 results

Further reading

  Eoin Young.  Memories of the Bear: A Biography of Denny Hulme. J H Haynes & Co. Ltd. .

References

External links

An Appreciation of Denny Hulme
"Follow The Bear" – a personal memoir of Hulme
Denny Hulme statistics
Biographical article and video clip on The Speed Blog
The Bruce McLaren Trust Official Website
New Zealand Sports Hall of Fame
 Trio At The Top – a documentary about Bruce McLaren, Denny Hulme and Chris Amon on NZ On Screen

1936 births
1992 deaths
Indianapolis 500 Rookies of the Year
Indianapolis 500 drivers
International Motorsports Hall of Fame inductees
New Zealand racing drivers
New Zealand Formula One drivers
New Zealand people of English descent
New Zealand expatriate sportspeople in Australia
New Zealand expatriate sportspeople in England
Brabham Formula One drivers
McLaren Formula One drivers
International Race of Champions drivers
BRDC Gold Star winners
Formula One World Drivers' Champions
Formula One race winners
24 Hours of Le Mans drivers
12 Hours of Reims drivers
24 Hours of Daytona drivers
12 Hours of Sebring drivers
British Formula Three Championship drivers
Tasman Series drivers
World Sportscar Championship drivers
People from Motueka
New Zealand Officers of the Order of the British Empire
European Touring Car Championship drivers
Filmed deaths in motorsport
Australian Endurance Championship drivers